Luis Antonio Migueles (born 1 April 1965 in San Salvador) is a retired Argentine middle-distance runner who competed primarily in the 800 meters. He represented his country at five indoor and two outdoor World Championships. In addition he won multiple medals on regional level.

Migueles is still the Argentine record holder in several events.

Competition record

Personal bests
Outdoor
800 metres – 1:46.01 (Bratislava 1986) NR
1000 metres – 2:21.9 (Prague 1986) NR
1500 metres – 3:48.93 (São Paulo 1993)
Indoor
800 metres – 1:49.00 (Seville 1991) NR
1000 metres – 2:23.31 (Madrid 1991) NR

References

All-Athletics profile

1965 births
Living people
Sportspeople from Entre Ríos Province
Argentine male middle-distance runners
World Athletics Championships athletes for Argentina
Athletes (track and field) at the 1987 Pan American Games
Athletes (track and field) at the 1991 Pan American Games
South American Games silver medalists for Argentina
South American Games medalists in athletics
Competitors at the 1986 South American Games
Pan American Games competitors for Argentina
20th-century Argentine people